Walang Karugtong ang Nakaraan is a 1987 Filipino drama film directed by Leroy Salvador and written by Rene O. Villanueva and Raquel Villavicencio. Based on the TSS Komiks "komik" of the same name by Gilda Olvidado, it stars Christopher de Leon, Sharon Cuneta, Carmi Martin, Chanda Romero, Ronaldo Valdez, Tommy Abuel, Ali Sotto and Katrin Gonzales. Produced by Viva Films, the film was released on 26 November 1987.

Plot
The story revolves around Ronic (Christopher de Leon) and Malou (Sharon Cuneta) who are currently facing tests in life. Ronic's wife died and he was depressed and down and would want to move on, while Malou's mother is suffering a disease that pushed her to work as a waitress in a club. Ronic meets Malou and sees a lot of resemblance with his deceased wife, Rossana.

Cast
Christopher de Leon as Ronic
Sharon Cuneta as Malou
Carmi Martin as Lucy
Chanda Romero as Tess
Ronaldo Valdez as Mel
Tommy Abuel as Gil
Katrina Gonzales as Gretchen
Ali Sotto as Sandra
Marita Zobel as Malou's mother
Johnny Wilson as Ronic's father
Naty Santiago as Ronic's mother
Vangie Labalan as Didang
Bella Flores as club manager
Manny Castañeda as couturier / dressmaker
Club customers
Polly Cadsawan
Vic Belaro
Ronnie Jurado
Albert Garcia
Club hostess
Rosset Bustos
Liza Mojica
Jessica Damondamon
Gil's office secretaries
Abegail Morales
Gladys Cruz
Pilar de Leon as store owner
Baby Bayor as house tenant
Arnie Torres as Malou's mother's nurse
Lorena Bote as emergency nurse I
Ronic's housemaids
Irene Sarmiento
Asuncion Bation
Riza Navarro as typing class teacher
James Cooper as Malou's wedding hair dresser
Josie Tagle as talent promotion

Production
Director Leroy Salvador was accused of assaulting an employee of Bulacan Gardens in Quezon City during production of the film.

Release
Walang Karugtong ang Nakaraan was released on 26 November 1987.

References

External links

1987 films
1987 romantic drama films
Filipino-language films
Films based on Philippine comics
Philippine drama films
Philippine films based on comics